The holding is a court's determination of a matter of law based on the issue presented in the particular case. In other words: under this law, with these facts, this result. It is the same as a 'decision' made by the judge; however "decision" can also refer to the judge's entire opinion, containing, for example, a discussion of facts, issues, and law as well as the holding. The holding is the "legal principle to be drawn from the opinion (decision) of the court."

Appellate review
"The word 'holding' is indefinite and may refer to a trial ruling of the court upon evidence or other questions presented during the trial. Of course, no oral statement made by the court at the close of a trial, nor any written memorandum opinion filed, may be assigned as error on appeal, as the final decision in a law action is the judgment signed, based upon the court's findings of fact and conclusions of law."

See also
Ratio decidendi
Obiter dictum (almost always shortened to dictum or, when plural, dicta in legal contexts; not to be confused with the broader meaning of dictum outside of a legal context - one of authority, as opposed to persuasiveness [at best] without being binding)

Notes

Common law legal terminology